Predslava (?-990), was a Grand Princess of the Kiev by marriage to Sviatoslav I, Grand Prince of Kiev (r. 945–972).

Issue
 Oleg of Drelinia (died 977?)
 Yaropolk I of Kiev (952 - 978)

References

Year of birth unknown
Date of death unknown
Kievan Rus' princesses
10th-century Rus' women